Jannik is a masculine given name. It is originally a Low German nickname based on both Jan and Johan. Notable people with the name include:

Jannik Bandowski (born 1994), German footballer
Jannik Petersen Bjerrum (1851–1920), Danish ophthalmologist
Jannik Blair (born 1992), Australian wheelchair basketball player
Jannik Christensen (born 1992), Danish ice hockey player
Jannik Fischer (born 1990), Swiss ice hockey player
Jannik Freese (born 1986), German basketball player
Jannik Hansen (born 1986), Danish ice hockey player
Jannik Skov Hansen (born 1993), Danish footballer
Jannik Hastrup (born 1941), Danish writer, film director, producer, illustrator and animator
Jannik Huth (born 1994), German footballer
Jannik Johansen (born 1965), Danish film director and screenwriter
Jannik Kohlbacher (born 1995), German handball player
Jannik Lindbæk (born 1939), Norwegian banker and businessman
Jannik Müller (born 1994), German footballer
Jannik Pohl (born 1996), Danish footballer
Jannik Schümann (born 1992), German actor and voice actor
Jannik Sinner (born 2001), Italian tennis player
Jannik Sommer (born 1991), German footballer
Jannik Stevens (born 1992), German footballer
Jannik Stoffels (born 1997), German footballer
Jannik Vestergaard (born 1992), Danish footballer

References

Masculine given names
Danish masculine given names
German masculine given names